The 2012 IIHF U18 World Championship Division II was a pair of international under-18 ice hockey tournaments organised by the International Ice Hockey Federation. In 2012 was introduced a new format of the IIHF World U18 Championships, therefore Division II A and Division II B now represent the fourth and the fifth tier of the IIHF World U18 Championships.

Division II A
The Division II A tournament was played in Heerenveen, Netherlands, from 31 March to 6 April 2012.

Participants

Final standings

Results
All times are local. (Central European Summer Time – UTC+2)

Division II B
The Division II B tournament was played in Novi Sad, Serbia, from 20 to 26 March 2012.

Participants

Final standings

Results
All times are local. (Central European Time – UTC+1 / 26 March 2012 Central European Summer Time – UTC+2)

References

IIHF World U18 Championship Division II
II
International ice hockey competitions hosted by the Netherlands
International ice hockey competitions hosted by Serbia
Ere
Ere